Pescarolo ed Uniti is a comune (municipality) in the Province of Cremona in the Italian region Lombardy, located about  southeast of Milan and about  northeast of Cremona.

Pescarolo ed Uniti borders the following municipalities: Cappella de' Picenardi, Cicognolo, Gabbioneta-Binanuova, Grontardo, Pessina Cremonese, Vescovato.

Demographic evolution

References

Cities and towns in Lombardy